Barbara Ruth Mueller (September 10, 1925 – November 17, 2016) was an American philatelist who remained, all her life, dedicated to the study of American philately. Her studies led her to a career of writing significant philatelic literature.

Collecting interests
Mueller's interests lay in philately of the United States. She created various collections as part of her studies, such as her collection of Pomeroy's Express labels.

Philatelic activity
Mueller was very active in American philately. She was a life member of the American Philatelic Society (APS), having been a member for 65 years. She also had served the United States Stamp Society, chairing a number of committees and contributing to, and editing, the society’s journal, The United States Specialist from 1972 through 1977. At the National Postal Museum at the Smithsonian Institution in Washington, D.C., she worked on the files of former Post Office department executive Arthur M. Travers.

From 1986 to 1990, Mueller was editor of the American Philatelic Congress Book and, from 1963 to 1993, editor of the Essay Proof Journal.

Publications
Barbara Mueller authored a number of publications. Her book Common Sense Philately was published in 1956. Based on her detailed studies, she published various detailed studies, such as John E. Javit, American Engraver and Printer.

Honors and awards
Mueller received many awards for her writings, including the McCoy award, the Luff Award in 1956, the Lichtenstein Medal in 1981, and the Smithsonian Philatelic Achievement Award. She has been named to the United States Stamp Society Hall of Fame and the APS Writers Unit 30 Hall of Fame, and she was invited to sign the Roll of Distinguished Philatelists in July 2009.

Barbara R. Mueller Award
The Barbara R. Mueller Award for the best article published each year in the APS monthly journal American Philatelist, was established in 2007 by the United States Stamp Society in Mueller's honor.

See also
 Philately
 Philatelic literature

References

 Barbara Mueller One of Four Invited to Sign Roll of Distinguished Philatelists in July

1925 births
2016 deaths
Philatelic literature
American philatelists
American non-fiction writers
American women writers
Fellows of the Royal Philatelic Society London
Signatories to the Roll of Distinguished Philatelists
Women philatelists
Smithsonian Institution people
People from Jefferson, Wisconsin
21st-century American women